William Thomas Lucas (1875–1973) was a Canadian farmer and a federal politician.

He was born in Bailieboro, Ontario, on July 26, 1875, to John William and Margaret (née Fair) Lucas, both of Irish descent. He attended public schooling in the Bailieboro area as well as the Ontario Agricultural College. On 9 January 1903, Lucas married Charlotte "Lottie" Perrin, of Bailieboro. With her he had three children. His religion was listed as Anglican.

Lucas was first elected to the House of Commons of Canada in the 1921 Canadian federal election as a United Farmers of Alberta candidate. He defeated two other candidates including former Alberta MLA James Bismark Holden in a landslide where he captured 81 per cent of the vote to win his first term in office.

His electoral district was abolished due to redistribution and he ran for re-election in the new Camrose riding in the 1925 Canadian federal election. He defended his incumbency less than a year later when the minority government of Arthur Meighen fell. Lucas won a third term in the 1926 Canadian federal election defeating Liberal candidate Donald McIvor. McIvor and Lucas would face each other again in the 1930 Canadian federal election he would be re-elected increasing his margin of victory over McIvor.

In 1932, the other eight United Farmers of Alberta MPs joined the newly founded Co-operative Commonwealth Federation and ran as CCF candidates in the 1935 Canadian federal election. Lucas refused to join the CCF and ran instead as a Conservative and finished third behind Social Credit candidate James Alexander Marshall and George Smith of the Liberal Party.

During his terms in office, he resided at Lougheed, Alberta, where he also farmed.

When his son, John W. (Jack) died in January 1960, William T. Lucas and Charlotte Perrin, his parents were listed as survivors.

William Thomas Lucas died March 27, 1973, in Peterborough.

Electoral history

References

External links

1875 births
1973 deaths
Canadian Anglicans
Members of the House of Commons of Canada from Alberta
United Farmers of Alberta MPs